Kaşınhanı railway station is a station in Kaşınhanı, Konya on the Konya-Yenice railway. The station is served by the Taurus Express and the Konya-Karaman Regional, which the later serves as a connecting train to Karaman for YHT trains terminating in Konya.

The station will be the southern terminus of a new railway bypass of Konya. Construction of a new railway station, along with a junction was started in 2015. The original station was opened on 25 October 1904, by the Baghdad Railway.

References

External links
Kaşınhanı station timetable

Railway stations in Konya Province
Railway stations opened in 1904
1904 establishments in the Ottoman Empire
Meram District